The Fine Arts Interdisciplinary Resource (FAIR) School for Arts is a magnet high school located in downtown Minneapolis, Minnesota, United States. It is a part of Minneapolis Public Schools and educates students in grades 9-12.

References

 http://fair.mpls.k12.mn.us

External links
 Official site

Public elementary schools in Minnesota
Public middle schools in Minnesota
Public high schools in Minnesota
High schools in Minneapolis